Mauidrillia praecophinodes is an extinct species of sea snail, a marine gastropod mollusk in the family Horaiclavidae.

Description

Distribution
This extinct marine species is endemic to New Zealand.

References

 Suter, Henry. Descriptions of New Tertiary Mollusca Occurring in New Zealand Part I. 1917.
 Maxwell, P.A. (2009). Cenozoic Mollusca. pp. 232–254 in Gordon, D.P. (ed.) New Zealand inventory of biodiversity. Volume one. Kingdom Animalia: Radiata, Lophotrochozoa, Deuterostomia. Canterbury University Press, Christchurch

External links
  P. Marshall, Additional Fossils from Target Gully, near Oamaru; Transactions and Proceedings of the Royal Society of New Zealand (1917)
 Revised descriptions of New Zealand Cenozoic Mollusca from Beu and Maxwell (1990): Mauidrillia costifer

praecophinodes
Gastropods described in 1917